The Central District of Sepidan County is a district (bakhsh) in Sepidan County, Fars Province, Iran. At the 2006 census, its population was 24,059, in 5,363 families.  The District has one city: Ardakan. The District has two rural districts (dehestan): Khafri Rural District and Komehr Rural District.

References 

Sepidan County
Districts of Fars Province